The Sportfreunde Hamborn 07 are a German association football club based in Hamborn, a district in the north of Duisburg.

History
The club has its origin in 1903, when the Ballspiel-Club Hamborn was founded, which merged four years later with the SV Marxloh to the SV Hamborn 07. In 1954, the current club was created after the merger of SV Hamborn 07 and the Sportfreunde Hamborn.

Before the formation of the Bundesliga, the SV Hamborn 07 competed in the Oberliga West division. Their highest finish in the league was in 1948, when they finished in 4th place.

The club now plays in the tier seven Bezirksliga Niederrhein after relegation from the Oberliga Niederrhein in 2013 and the Landesliga Niederrhein in 2014.

References

External links
Club official website

 
Football clubs in Germany
Association football clubs established in 1907
1907 establishments in Germany
Football clubs in North Rhine-Westphalia
Sport in Duisburg